Jákup Johansen (born 27 April 1993) is a Faroese professional footballer who plays as a forward for Víkingur.

References

External links

1993 births
Living people
Faroese footballers
Faroe Islands international footballers
Association football forwards
Skála ÍF players
Víkingur Gøta players
Faroe Islands Premier League players